The Walls and gate of Villa de Monteagudo de las Vicarías (Spanish: Muralla y Puerta de la Villa de Monteagudo de las Vicarías) is a gate located in Monteagudo de las Vicarías, Spain. It was declared Bien de Interés Cultural in 1931.

References 

Bien de Interés Cultural landmarks in the Province of Soria
Monteagudo de las Vicarías